Coachwork International was a bus manufacturer in Palmerston North, New Zealand. Founded in 1926 as New Zealand Motor Bodies, in 1983 it merged with Hawke Coachwork to form Coachwork International. It ceased trading in 1993.

History

New Zealand Motor Bodies

New Zealand Motor Bodies (NZMB) was established in 1926 as Munt, Cottrell, Nielsen and Company Limited when Munt, Cottrell & Co of Wellington and Neilsen's Body Works of Dannevirke merged.

NZMB operated from the corner of Hutt Road and Jackson Street in Petone building metal frame bus and coach bodies and other commercial bodies, hoists and other truck equipment. It bodied over 1,000 Bedford SBs for the New Zealand Railways Department.

A new factory building in Keith Street Palmerston North was opened on 3 July 1977. The new plant covered 18,000 square metres.

Coachwork International
In 1983 NZMB merged with competitor Hawke Coachwork to form Coachwork International. Owned by Moller Corporation and Newmans, in 1987 it held an 80% share of the New Zealand bus bodying market. Production continued at the Palmerston North plant, while Hawke's plant in Takanini was retained, specialising in building and repairing buses for city authorities. In 1988, Coachwork International was purchased by Jaguar Rover Australia. After Jaguar Rover Australia was placed in administration, and with the impending end of tariff protection. Deloitte & Touche received no offers to purchase the business with operations ceasing in June 1993.

Products
In 1973, it produced the first of 590 VoV bodies for imported Mercedes-Benz, Volvo and MAN bus chassis.
In 1977 NZMB obtained manufacturing rights for the Swiss Carrosserie Hess system. In the early-1980s, NZMB bodied 450 Volvo B58 and Mercedes-Benz buses for Singapore Bus Service. In 1981 it began assembling Plaxton Supreme bodies delivered in CKD packs from England.

References

External links

Bus manufacturers of New Zealand
Palmerston North
Vehicle manufacturing companies established in 1926
Vehicle manufacturing companies disestablished in 1993
New Zealand companies established in 1926
1993 disestablishments in New Zealand